Montague Philip Mendoza (October 14, 1898 – 1973) was a London-born British artist and cartoonist.  He served as a private with the British Army from 1914 until 1920.  After the World War I and during World War II, he became a popular poster designer.  In 1951, he became a comic artist.

Most of his poster art featured anthropomorphised mice.

References

External links
 Philip Mendoza Lambiek Comiclopedia article

British cartoonists
British comics artists
1898 births
1973 deaths
British Army personnel of World War I
British poster artists